Decline may refer to:

Decadence, involves a perceived decay in standards, morals, dignity, religious faith, or skill over time
"Decline" (song), 2017 song by Raye and Mr Eazi
The Decline (EP), an EP by NOFX
The Decline (band), Australian skate punk band from Perth
The Decline (film), a 2020 Canadian thriller drama film

See also
Declination (disambiguation)
Declinism
Decline and Fall (disambiguation)
Decline of the Roman Empire
Decline of Detroit
Ottoman decline thesis
The Decline of the West by Oswald Spengler
Social disintegration,
Societal collapse
Withering away of the state